Mann is a German, Jewish (Ashkenazic) or English surname of Germanic origin. It means 'man', 'person', 'husband'. In the runic alphabet, the meaning 'man', 'human', is represented by the single character ᛗ.

Mann (or Maan) is also an Indian surname found among the Jats in Punjab.

Notable people with this surname include:

A–D
 Abby Mann (1927–2008), American film writer and producer
 Aimee Mann (born 1960), American rock guitarist, bass player, singer, and songwriter
 Alakina Mann (born 1990), English actress
 Alex Mann (bobsleigh) (born 1980), German bobsledder
 Alfred Mann (musicologist) (1917–2006), American writer
 Alfred E. Mann (1925–2016), American entrepreneur and philanthropist
 Ammtoje Mann, Punjabi actor and director
 Anthony Mann (1906–1967), American actor and film director
 Arthur Henry Mann (1850–1929), English organist, choirmaster, teacher and composer at King's College Chapel, Cambridge
 B. B. Mann (1858–1948), Wales national rugby union player
 Barry Mann (born 1939), American songwriter
 Bernhard Mann (born 1950), German sociologist and public-health scholar
 Bhagwant Mann (born 1973), Indian politician and comedian 
 Billy Mann (born 1968), American record producer/singer/songwriter
 Bonnie Mann, American philosopher
 Braden Mann (born 1997), American football player
 Brandon Mann (born 1984), American professional baseball player
 Bruce Mann (disambiguation), several people
 Carol Mann (born 1941), American championship golfer
 Charles Mann (disambiguation), several people
 Colette Mann (born 1950), Australian actress
 Coramae Richey Mann (1931–2004), American professor emeritus of criminal justice at the University of Illinois
 Curtis Mann (1815–1894), American businessman and politician
 Daniel Mann (1912–1991), American film director: How the West Was Won, Butterfield 8, I'll Cry Tomorrow
 David Mann (disambiguation), several people
 Delbert Mann (1920–2007), American television and film director
 Denis Mann (born 1935), Scottish glass artist
 Dhar Mann (born 1984), Indian American entrepreneur and film producer
 Dick Mann (1934–2021), American motorcycle racer
 Dieter Mann (1942-2022), German actor
 Donald Mann (1853–1934), Canadian railway contractor and entrepreneur
 Duane Mann, New Zealand rugby league footballer

E–I
 Edith Weiss-Mann (1885-1951) German musicologist and harpsichordist
 Edna Mann (1926–1985), English painter
 Edward S. Mann (1908–2005), educator and former president of the Eastern Nazarene College
 Elisabeth Mann Borgese (1918–2002), German environmentalist, daughter of Thomas Mann
 Erika Mann (1905–1969), German actress and writer, daughter of Thomas Mann
 Erika Mann (politician) (born 1950), German politician and Member of the European Parliament with the political party SPD
 Franceska Mann (1917–1943), Polish dancer
 Frank Mann (disambiguation), several people
 Gabriel Mann (born 1972), American actor
 George Mann (disambiguation), several people
 Gloria Mann, American pop singer
 Golo Mann (1909–1994), German popular historian, son of Thomas Mann
 Gother Mann (1746–1830), Lieutenant-General, Royal Engineers, Inspector-General of Fortifications
 Gother Victor Fyers Mann (1863–1948), Australian architect, artist and Director of the Art Gallery of New South Wales
 Gustav Mann (1836–1916), German botanist
 Harbhajan Mann, Punjabi singer and actor
 Harold Hart Mann (1872–1961), English agricultural scientist who worked in India 
 Heinrich Mann (1871–1950), German novelist, brother of Thomas Mann
 Henry Mann (1905–2000), American mathematician and statistician (born in Vienna, Austria)
 Herbie Mann (1930–2003), American jazz flautist and practitioner of world music
 Homer B. Mann (1869–1950), American college president, insurance businessman and politician
 Horace Mann (1796–1859), American education reformer and abolitionist
 Horace Mann Jr. (1844–1868), American botanist, son of Horace Mann
 Ian Mann, British space weather weather researcher

J–M
 J. J. Mann, (born 1991), American basketball player
 Jack Mann (disambiguation), several people
 Jackie Mann (1914–1995), former RAF fighter pilot, kidnapped in Lebanon in 1989
 James Mann (disambiguation), several people
 Jessica Mann (1937–2018), British writer
 Jimmy Mann (disambiguation), several people
 John Mann (disambiguation), several people
 Jonathan Mann (disambiguation), several people
 Kal Mann (1917–2001), American lyricist, writer of lyrics for several popular songs
 Kalman Mann (1912–1997), Israeli physicianm director general of Hadassah Medical Center
 Karl-Rüdiger Mann (born 1950), German swimmer
 Kathryn Mann, mathematician
 Kevin Danell Mann, American rapper better known as Brotha Lynch Hung
 Klaus Mann (1906–1949), German, son of Thomas Mann
 Larry Mann (1930–1952), American racecar (NASCAR) driver
 Larry D. Mann (1922–2014), Canadian radio personality and television/film actor
 Leslie Mann (born 1972), American actress
 Lisa Mann, American electric blues bassist, songwriter and singer
 Lorene Mann (1937–2013), American country music singer-songwriter
 Louis Mann (1865–1931), American actor
 Madeline Mann (born 1989), American who once held the record for being the smallest known premature baby to survive
 Manfred Mann (musician) (born 1940), musician from South Africa, after whom the eponymous band was named
 Marion Mann (1920-2022), American physician and pathologist
 Marion Mann (singer) (1914-2004), American singer
 Matthias Mann (born 1959), German scientist in the field of mass spectrometry and proteomics
 Merlin Mann (born 1966), American writer and editor; author of productivity blog 43folders.com
 Michael Mann (born 1943), American film director, screenwriter, and producer
 Michael Mann (scholar) (1919–1977), German-born American musician and professor of German literature, youngest son of Thomas Mann
 Michael Mann (sociologist) (born 1942), British-born professor of sociology at UCLA
 Michael E. Mann (born 1965), American climate scientist, professor, and member of United States National Academy of Sciences (NAS)
 Monika Mann (1910–1992), German novelist, daughter of Thomas Mann
 Moshe Mann (1907–2004), Israeli military officer who was the first commander of the Golani Brigade
 Murray Gell-Mann (1929–2019), American physicist who received the 1969 Nobel Prize in physics

N–Z
 Nancy Mann, American statistician
 Nicole Aunapu Mann (born 1977), American astronaut
 Olly Mann (born 1981), British broadcaster and podcaster
 Otto Mann, fictional school bus driver from the animated TV comedy show The Simpsons
 Paul Mann (1913–1985), Canadian film and theater actor
 Richie Mann (born 1954), Canadian politician
 Robert Mann (1920–2018), American violinist and composer, founder of the Juilliard String Quartet
 Robert "Bob" Mann (born 1958), American journalist and historian
 Ron Mann (born 1959), Canadian documentary film director
 Ronnie Mann (born 1986), English mixed martial arts fighter
 Sally Mann (born 1951), American photographer
 Sharry Mann, Punjabi songwriter and singer
 Shwe Mann (born 1947), Myanmar high-ranked military commander and government official
 Simon Mann, former British Army officer and convicted mercenary
 Simon Mann (cricket commentator), British broadcaster
 Steve Mann (guitarist) (1943–2009), American songwriter and guitarist
 Steve Mann (inventor) (born 1962), Canadian professor, founder of the field of wearable computing    
 Tamela Mann, American Gospel singer
 Ted Mann (1916–2001), American theatre chain owner
 Terance Mann (born 1996), American basketball player
 Terrence Mann (born 1951), American singer and actor
 Thaddeus Mann (1908–1993), Polish-English biochemist
 Thomas Mann (1875–1955), German novelist, essayist, Nobel Prize laureate
 Thomas Mann (disambiguation)
 Tom Mann (1856–1941), British trade unionist
 Tracey Mann, US Representative from Kansas and former Lieutenant Governor
 Tracy Mann, Australian actress
 Trevor Mann (born 1988), American professional wrestler known by his ring name Ricochet
 Troy Mann (born 1969), Canadian ice hockey coach
 Tufty Mann (1920–1952), South African cricketer
 Wesley Mann (born 1959), American actor
 William Mann (disambiguation), several people

See also 
 Manne
 Man (name), given name and surname
 Maan (surname), given name and surname

English-language surnames
German-language surnames
Indian surnames
Surnames of Indian origin
Jat clans of Punjab
Punjabi-language surnames
Sikh communities
Hindu surnames